Nigel Paul Huddleston (born 13 October 1970) is a British politician serving as Minister of State for International Trade since February 2023. He served as Parliamentary Under-Secretary of State at the Department for Digital, Culture, Media and Sport from 2020 to 2022. A member of the Conservative Party, he has been Member of Parliament (MP) for Mid Worcestershire since 2015.

Early life and education
Nigel Paul Huddleston was born in Lincoln, England, on 13 October 1970. He was educated at the Robert Pattinson Comprehensive School, a state secondary school in North Hykeham in Lincolnshire, followed by Christ Church, Oxford, where he studied politics and economics. He received an Masters in Business Administration from the UCLA Anderson School of Management in Los Angeles, California.

Career
Huddleston started his career as a consultant for Arthur Andersen. He continued his career at Deloitte, and later worked as the industry head of travel for Google.

In 2010, Huddleston was the Conservative candidate for Luton South, and lost by 2,329 votes to Labour's Gavin Shuker. In 2014, he was selected as a parliamentary candidate in a primary election in which anyone on the constituency's electoral register was eligible to vote. The constituency association did not publish the votes that each candidate received. Since the 2015 general election, he has been the Conservative MP for Mid Worcestershire.

Huddleston is a board member of the Tory Reform Group. In Parliament, he sat on the Culture, Media and Sport Select Committee.

Huddleston was opposed to Brexit prior to the 2016 referendum on EU membership.

In February 2019, Huddleston was appointed as the Conservatives' new vice chairman for youth. He was responsible for attracting young people to the party's ranks. After Boris Johnson became Prime Minister in July 2019, Huddleston was appointed as an assistant whip, leaving his role as vice chairman.

In the 2020 cabinet reshuffle, Huddleston was appointed Parliamentary Under-Secretary of State for Sport, Tourism and Heritage, replacing Nigel Adams and Helen Whately. During 2021, he served as Parliamentary Under-Secretary of State for Sport and Tourism. On 8 October 2021, Huddleston took over the duties of the former role of Parliamentary under-secretary of state for civil society, held by The Baroness Barran until the role was abolished. Huddleston then became Parliamentary Under-Secretary of State for Sport, Tourism, Heritage and Civil Society.

Personal life
Huddleston lives in Badsey, Worcestershire, with his wife Melissa, who is American, and their two children.

Notes

References

External links
 
 

1970 births
Alumni of Christ Church, Oxford
Google people
Conservative Party (UK) MPs for English constituencies
Living people
People from Lincoln, England
Politicians from Worcestershire
UCLA Anderson School of Management alumni
UK MPs 2015–2017
UK MPs 2017–2019
UK MPs 2019–present